Donald Black was a British businessman and accountant in Hong Kong. Black was a partner of the Peat, Marwick, Mitchell & Co. until he retired in March 1962. He was appointed provisionally to the Legislative Council as an unofficial member during the absence of Hugh Barton from July to November 1960.

References

Hong Kong businesspeople
Hong Kong accountants
Members of the Legislative Council of Hong Kong